Peter Brodrick (born 11 May 1937) is an English cricketer. He played twenty-two first-class matches for Cambridge University Cricket Club between 1959 and 1961.

See also
 List of Cambridge University Cricket Club players

References

External links
 

1937 births
Living people
English cricketers
Cambridge University cricketers
Sportspeople from North Shields
Cricketers from Tyne and Wear
Northumberland cricketers